Eva Aurora Charlotta Karamzin (née Stjernvall) (1 / 7 August 1808 Ulvila – 13 May 1902 Helsinki) was a Finnish philanthropist. Her better-known names are Princess Aurora Demidova and Aurora Karamzin, titles that were acquired after her first and second marriages, respectively.

Early life
She was born in Ulvila, in Saaren Kartano, Finland, into a Swedish-speaking family. She was the daughter of Carl Johan Stjernvall (1764–1815) and his wife, Baroness Eva Gustava von Willebrand (1781–1844). Her father was a high official in the Grand Duchy of Finland and became the First Governor of the Viipuri Province in 1812. Following Stjernvall's death in 1815, the Baroness remarried and became the wife of Finland's Procurator, Carl Johan Walleen (1781-1867).

Karamzin had an older brother, Emil Stjernvall Walleen (1806–1890) who added his stepfather's name to his own and later became a Finnish Minister of State and a Baron. She also had two sisters, Emilie Stjernvall (1811–1846) and Alexandra (Aline) Stjernvall (1812–1851). She was a close relative of Finnish writer Marie Linder. Emilie married Count Vladimir  while Alexandra became the second wife of Baron José Maurício Correia Henriques, later . They also had three half-brothers from their mother's second marriage to Walleen, of them Vladimir Alfons became a Major General and a Governor.

Life

Aurora was appointed as a lady-in-waiting to Empress Alexandra Fedorovna the elder (consort to Tsar Nicholas I of Russia), and a lady of the bedchamber of Empress Alexandra Feodorovna the younger and Empress Maria Feodorovna. 

She was made a dame of the Order of Saint Catherine, the highest honour for ladies in Imperial Russia. Evgeny Baratynsky dedicated a poem to her, both in Russian and French ("Go and breathe inspiration into us, you the namesake of dawn... for whom you will become the sun of happiness?"), as he did to her sister Countess Emilie.

In Helsinki on 9 January 1836, she married Pavel Nikolayevich Demidov (1798–1840). In 1846, after Demidov's death, she remarried to Colonel Andrei . 

After the death of Aurora's second husband, she occupied herself with the practical matters of her Järvenperä (Träskända) manor in Espoo, Finland and with her growing interest in charity. Karamzin used the immense wealth inherited from her first husband to create benevolent institutions in Helsinki, such as schools, public kitchens and the Deaconess Institution of Helsinki fi
in 1867, which was the first institution in Finland for educating nurses. She was considered a great benefactor in many cities such as Saint Petersburg and Florence.

Her native language was Swedish and she was fluent in French and spoke also Russian and Finnish.

Karamzin's only child was Pavel Pavlovich Demidov (1839–1885). In 1870, Pavel succeeded his childless uncle, Anatoly Nikolaievich Demidov, as the 2nd Prince of San Donato.

Her granddaughter and namesake Princess Aurora Pavlovna Demidova married Arsen Karađorđević, Prince of Serbia and became the mother of the Yugoslav regent, Prince Paul of Yugoslavia. Demidova's granddaughter is Princess Elizabeth of Yugoslavia, now living in Serbia, and the mother of Catherine and Christina Oxenberg.

She died aged 93 in Helsinki on 13 May 1902.

Places named after Aurora Karamzin in the Helsinki metropolitan area 
 Aurora Street (Helsinki, Töölö)
 Aurora Hospital (Helsinki)
 Aurora Hall, (Helsinki Deaconess Institute)
 Karamzinin Street (Helsinki, Töölö)
 Auroragate (street in Espoo, Järvenperä)
 Aurora Karamzin Park (Espoo)
 Aurora Kindegarden (Espoo)
 Aurora School (Espoo)
 Aurora House (Espoo)
 Aurora Chapell (Espoo)
 Aurora reception home (Espoo)
 Karamzin School (Espoo)
Art House Little Aurora  (Espoo)

References

External links
 Alexandra (Aline) Stjernevall from Geneall.net
 

1808 births
1902 deaths
People from Ulvila
Russian princesses by marriage
Philanthropists from the Russian Empire
Ladies-in-waiting from the Russian Empire
19th-century philanthropists
19th-century Finnish nobility
Finnish people from the Russian Empire
Finnish philanthropists
Swedish-speaking Finns
19th-century Finnish women